Megalophaedusa martensi is a species of medium-sized air-breathing land snail, a terrestrial pulmonate gastropod mollusk in the family Clausiliidae, the door snails, all of which have a clausilium.

Description
Megalophaedusa martensi is the largest species in the family Clausiliidae, worldwide. The species is oviparous.

Distribution
This species is endemic to Japan.

References

Clausiliidae
Gastropods described in 1860